Grant Adamson is an Australian former professional rugby league footballer who played for the Gold Coast Seagulls in the ARL competition.

Playing career
Adamson played one first grade game for the Gold Coast against Illawarra in round 5 1995 at WIN Stadium which ended in a 34–16 loss.

He also played for the Burleigh Bears in the 1998 Queensland Cup.

References 

Australian rugby league players
Gold Coast Chargers players
Year of birth missing (living people)
Living people
Burleigh Bears players
Place of birth missing (living people)
Rugby league five-eighths